Jordison is a surname meaning "Son of Jordan". It may refer to:

Joey Jordison (1975–2021), American drummer for the band Slipknot
Joel Jordison (born 1978), Canadian curler
John Jordison (born 1981), English cricketer

English-language surnames